Anizy-le-Grand is a commune in the department of Aisne in the Hauts-de-France region of northern France. It was established on 1 January 2019 from the merger of the communes of Anizy-le-Château, Faucoucourt and Lizy.

Population

See also
 Communes of the Aisne department

References

Communes of Aisne
Communes nouvelles of Aisne
Populated places established in 2019
2019 establishments in France